Nigeria CommunicationsWeek is a Nigerian online and print newspaper that reports on information technology. The editor-in-chief is Ken Nwogbo. The newspaper is located in Lagos State, Nigeria.Nigeria communicationsweek said that they have been reporting and publishing since 2007.

According to The Guardian, CommunicationsWeek Media Limited, is the publishers of Nigeria CommunicationsWeek newspaper that started the Beacon of ICT awards (BoICT) which is aimed at rewarding outstanding contributions to the growth of ICT in Nigeria.

References

Weekly newspapers published in Nigeria